Bidston Windmill is situated on Bidston Hill, near Birkenhead, on the Wirral Peninsula, England.

History
It is believed that there has been a windmill, on this site, since 1596. 
However, the mill was difficult to access by cart. The previous structure, a wooden peg mill, was destroyed by fire in 1791 (although some sources state 1793).  
During a gale, the sails got out of control and the friction produced by the revolving wooden mechanism caused the entire mill to burst into flames.

The current building was built around 1800 and continued working as a flour mill until about 1875. 
After falling into disuse the windmill and the land, on which it stands, was purchased by Birkenhead Corporation and restored from 1894.

There is a plaque on the windmill, which reads as follows:

The building was badly damaged in 1927, once again. A public subscription was then raised, in order to carry out the necessary repairs. 
The windmill has been reconditioned several times, since. During 2006, the roof of the windmill was replaced as part of a refurbishment program, in order to maintain the structure.

References

External links

 Bidston Hill Heritage Trail – Bidston Windmill
 Bidston – The Mill

Buildings and structures in the Metropolitan Borough of Wirral
Windmills in Merseyside
Tower mills in the United Kingdom
Grinding mills in the United Kingdom
Industrial buildings completed in 1793
Grade II* listed buildings in Merseyside
1793 establishments in England